The men's 4 × 100 metres relay event at the 2005 Summer Universiade was held on 19–20 August in Izmir, Turkey.

Medalists

Results

Heats

Final

References
Finals results
Full results

Athletics at the 2005 Summer Universiade
2005